Armamentarium is the third studio album by German melodic death metal band Neaera. It was released on 24 August 2007 through Metal Blade Records.

Packaging 
The first edition version of this album contains a bonus 61 minutes long DVD of Neaera playing live in their hometown of Münster.

Track listing

Credits 
Writing, performance and production credits are adapted from the album liner notes.

Personnel 
Neaera
 Benjamin Hilleke – vocals
 Stefan Keller – guitar
 Tobias Buck – guitar
 Benjamin Donath – bass
 Sebastian Heldt – drums

Additional musicians
 Marcus Bischoff (Heaven Shall Burn) – vocals on "Liberation"

Production
 Neaera – production
 Jacob Hansen – production, recording, mixing, mastering
 Alexander Dietz (Heaven Shall Burn) – vocals recording
 Ralf Müller – vocals recording

Artwork and design
  – artwork

Studios 
 Hansen Studios – recording, mixing, mastering
 Rape of Harmonies Studios – vocals recording

Chart performance

References

External links 
 
 Armamentarium at Metal Blade Records

2007 albums
Metal Blade Records albums
Neaera (band) albums